The 2022 Júbilo Iwata season was the club's 50th season in existence and the first season back in the top flight of Japanese football. In addition to the domestic league, Júbilo Iwata participated in this season's editions of the Emperor's Cup and the J.League Cup. Finishing at last place at the J1 League, the club got relegated back to the J2 League after just a season back on the first division.

Players

First-team squad

DSP

Out on loan

Transfers

In

Out

Competitions

Overall record

J1 League

League table

Results summary

Results by round

Matches 
The league fixtures were announced on 21 January 2022.

Emperor's Cup

J.League Cup

Group stage

Statistics

Goalscorers

References

Júbilo Iwata seasons
Júbilo Iwata